Busan Polytechnic College, formerly Busan IT Polytechnic College, is a private two-year technical college in southeastern South Korea.  The campus is situated in the Buk-gu district of Busan Metropolitan City.  The school's current president is Jo Yong-ho (조용호).   The official maximum enrollment is 920, of whom 200 may be enrolled in evening classes.

Academic departments
As a polytechnic college, the school's academics focus heavily on industrial and technological training.  There are currently six academic departments

Computer Assisted Design
Applied Computer Modelling
Electronic Instrumentation
Mechatronics
Automotive Electronics
Information Communications Systems

History

The college opened its doors on March 8, 1995.  The first president was Kim Byeong-gi (김병기).   At the time it was known by the same name as today, Busan Polytechnic College.  In 2002, the name was altered to Busan IT Polytechnic College (부산 디지털 정보 기능대학).  The name was finally changed back to the current version in 2003.

See also
Education in South Korea
List of colleges and universities in South Korea

External links 
  Official school website

Vocational education in South Korea
Universities and colleges in Busan
7, Busan
Buk District, Busan
1995 establishments in South Korea